Ervin Emil Dupper (January 8, 1923 – May 28, 2017) was an American politician in the state of South Dakota.

Career
He was a member of the South Dakota State Senate from 1965 to 1968. Throughout his state senate term, he represented the 21st and 23rd districts. He attended the University of Oregon where he earned a bachelor's degree in political science, and then attended the University of South Dakota School of Law for a law degree. He served a brief stint as State Attorney of Walworth County in 1955 to 1956 prior to his election to the state senate.

References

1923 births
2017 deaths
People from Campbell County, South Dakota
People from Mobridge, South Dakota
University of South Dakota School of Law alumni
University of Oregon alumni
South Dakota lawyers
Republican Party South Dakota state senators
20th-century American lawyers